William Rea may refer to:
 William Rea (ironmaster) who lived in Monmouth (now in Wales) in the early 18th century
 William Rea (politician), Member of the Queensland Legislative Assembly, Australia
 William Rea (real estate magnate) (1912–2006) of Pittsburgh, Pennsylvania
 William Rea (athlete) (born 1952), Austrian-American long jumper
 William J. Rea (1920-2005), U.S. federal judge